I've Always Wanted to Do This is the seventh studio album by Scottish musician Jack Bruce, released in December 1980 and credited to "Jack Bruce and Friends: Clem Clempson, Billy Cobham, David Sancious". The band toured to promote the album but it was not a commercial success and it would be almost a decade before Bruce would make another album for a major label.

Track listing 
All tracks composed by Jack Bruce and Pete Brown; except where indicated

Personnel
Jack Bruce - vocals, bass, harmonica
Clem Clempson - guitar
David Sancious - keyboards; guitar on "Living Without Ja" and "Out to Lunch"
Billy Cobham - drums
with:
Vin Scelsa - announcer voice on "Facelift 318"

References

Jack Bruce albums
1980 albums
Albums produced by Jack Bruce
Epic Records albums